AMD PowerTune is a series of dynamic frequency scaling technologies built into some AMD GPUs and APUs that allow the clock speed of the processor to be dynamically changed (to different P-states) by software. This allows the processor to meet the instantaneous performance needs of the operation being performed, while minimizing power draw, heat generation and noise avoidance. AMD PowerTune aims to solve thermal design power and performance constraints.

Besides the reduced energy consumption, AMD PowerTune helps to lower the noise levels created by the cooling in desktop computers, and extends battery life in mobile devices. AMD PowerTune is the successor to AMD PowerPlay.

Support for "PowerPlay" was added to the Linux kernel driver "amdgpu" on November 11, 2015.

As a lecture from CCC in 2014 shows, AMD's x86-64 SMU firmware is executed on some LatticeMico32 and PowerTune was modeled using Matlab. This is similar to Nvidia's PDAEMON, the RTOS responsible for power on their GPUs.

Overview 

AMD PowerTune was introduced in the TeraScale 3 (VLIW4) with Radeon HD 6900 on 15 December 2010 and has been available in different development stages on Radeon- and AMD FirePro-branded products ever since.

Over the years, reviews which document the development of AMD PowerTune have been published by AnandTech.

An additional technology named AMD ZeroCore Power has been available since the Radeon HD 7000 Series, implementing the Graphics Core Next microarchitecture.

The pointlessness of a fixed clock frequency was accredited in January 2014 by SemiAccurate.

Operating system support 

AMD Catalyst is available for Microsoft Windows and Linux and supports AMD PowerTune since version.

The free and open-source "Radeon" graphics device driver has some support for AMD PowerTune, see "Enduro".

Feature overview for AMD APUs

Feature overview for AMD graphics cards

See also
 AMD Cool'n'Quiet (for desktop CPUs)
 AMD PowerNow! (for laptop CPUs)
 AMD Turbo Core (for CPUs)
 AMD PowerXpress (for multi-GPUs)
 Dynamic frequency scaling
 Intel SpeedStep (for CPUs)
 Intel Turbo Boost (for CPUs)

References

External links
 

AMD software
AMD technologies
Clock signal
Graphics processing units